The following are the national records in track cycling in the Netherlands maintained by the Netherlands' national cycling federation, Royal Dutch Cycling Union.

Men

Women

References

External links
 Royal Dutch Cycling Union web site

Netherlands
Track cycling
Records
Track cycling